Ma Biao (born August 1954) is a retired Chinese politician of ethnic Zhuang heritage. Born in Guangxi, Ma joined the Chinese Communist Party (CCP) in 1985. He was elected chairman of the Guangxi government on January 26, 2008, and served this post until March 2013.
He was a member of the 18th Central Committee of the CCP. He additionally served as a vice chairman of the Chinese People's Political Consultative Conference between 2011 and 2023.

References

Living people
1954 births
People's Republic of China politicians from Guangxi
People from Baise
Zhuang people
Political office-holders in Guangxi
Chinese Communist Party politicians from Guangxi
Vice Chairpersons of the National Committee of the Chinese People's Political Consultative Conference